Angel Balzarino (August 4, 1943-June 9, 2018) was an Argentine writer.  During his lifetime, beginning in 1968; he published several novellas and a dozen books of stories.

Major works
 El Hombre que Tenía Miedo (stories), Ediciones E.R.A. (1974) No ISBN
 Las Otras Manos (stories), Editorial Colmegna (1987)   
 Hombres y Hazañas, Fondo Editorial Municipal (1995)  
 Mariel Entre Nosotros, El Francotirador Ediciones (1998) 
S.M.A.

References

External links
  Homepage
  Brief biography and list of works

Argentine male writers
1943 births
Living people